Tân Thuận may refer to several places in Vietnam, including:

 Tân Thuận, Cà Mau, a rural commune of Đầm Dơi District.
 , a rural commune of Hàm Thuận Nam District.
 , a rural commune of Vĩnh Thuận District.